{{Infobox television
| native_name  = 
| alt_name     = A Place Called Home
| image        = Mom's House fans club at West Lake Resortopia 20090127.jpg
| caption      = 'Mom's House fan club at West Lake Resortopia, January 2009
| genre        = Family  Romance  Society  Office Politics  Family Business
| runtime      = 120-150 minutes  45 minutes without advertisements (Mediacorp Channel 8)
| creator      =
| director     = 
| producer     = 
| writer       = 
| starring     = 
| opentheme    = #買醉的人 by Tsai Hsiao-hu 
愛無後悔 by 林姍、Weng Li-you
行棋 by Weng Li-you
珍惜 by Long Qianyu
望天 by Luo Shih-feng
用真心愛一個人 by Tsai Hsiao-hu
伴你過一生 by 林姍、Weng Li-you
香水 by 、Chang Hsiu-ching
| endtheme     = #〈牽手〉Su Rui
〈炮仔聲〉（2009年12月22日）(第415集)
詞：黃士祐、曲：森祐士、演唱：Jody Chiang
| country      = Taiwan
| language     = Hokkien (Formosa Television)
| network      = Formosa Television  Mediacorp Channel 8
| first_aired  = 
| last_aired   = 
| num_episodes = Taiwan : 415 episodes  Mediacorp Channel 8 : 937 episodes  (Each episode = 45 minutes without advertisements)
| related      =  
}}Mom's House is a Taiwanese Hokkien television drama that began airing on Formosa Television in Taiwan. This is also known as the first HD drama ever broadcast on Formosa Television. During the last week of the drama's run, where the final two episode were broadcast, Formosa Television received the highest rating ever recorded in their 8 o'clock slot, which was 9.78 million. On average, the show received 7.97 million viewers.

Plot
Retired principal, Lin Shishi, marries off his three daughters one by one. But even as his daughters venture into their brand new lives, Lin and his wife continue to give them their non-wavering support whenever they encounter obstacles in their marriages.

Cast
Shi Ying as Lin Shishi
Tang Meiyen as Wu Baozhu
Lei Hong as Peng Dahai
 as Peng Jianhong
Fon Cin as Lin Liyun

Accolades

International broadcast
Malaysia
The drama was broadcast on Astro Hua Hee Dai, weekdays at 8:30-9:30pm, starting on November 17, 2008 and concluding on July 8, 2012. Another Astro channel, Ria, broadcast the show in its original Taiwan episode length daily at 7pm starting on January 4, 2010 and ending on September 27, 2011. The drama was also broadcast on 8TV under the English title Mother's House for two episodes with one hour each from Monday to Friday, at 11:30 MST and 13:00 MST with a 30 minutes break of its Midday Mandarin News at 12:30 MST. The drama was broadcast on 8TV starting on January 2, 2013 and ending on October 21, 2014.

Gala Television
Gala Television another broadcaster in Taiwan, showed the drama Monday - Friday in the timeslot of 5-7pm, each day showing 2 one-hour format episodes on GTV One. The broadcast started on May 3, 2010 and concluded on October 14, 2011.

Indonesia
Indosiar broadcast the drama daily, 7-10pm, starting on May 9, 2011

Singapore
The drama was first broadcast on VV Drama  at 19:00–20:00 from Monday to Friday Premiere (+3) at 22:00–23:00. It was also broadcast in the morning from 1:14–2:04 am and 9:00–9:50 am. It was also broadcast in the afternoon from 2:00–2:50 pm. The broadcast started on December 5, 2009.

The series was also broadcast in Singapore Channel, Mediacorp Channel 8 on weekdays from 4:30 to 5:30 pm. It is the fifth Taiwan drama to broadcast the show in Singapore but due to local broadcast laws prohibiting radio or television broadcasts in Chinese dialects, the show was dubbed into Mandarin when it aired on Singapore's MediaCorp Channel 8, thus making it the first channel to broadcast the show in Mandarin. The show began on 13 March 2015 and has a total of 937 episodes and ended its run in 2018.

Repeat Telecast (2018)
The series is repeating its broadcast from 4–6:00 am after succeeding The Spirits of Love and ended its repeat telecast in 2019, Taste of Life'' took over the 04:00 SST timeslot at Mediacorp Channel 8

Macau
TDM Ou Mun broadcast the drama on the weekdays, showing two episodes. One at 11:30-12:30pm and one at 1:00pm–2:00pm. Broadcast started on December 5, 2011.

References

External links
 Mom's House

Hokkien-language television shows
Taiwanese drama television series
2008 Taiwanese television series debuts
2009 Taiwanese television series endings
Formosa Television original programming
Television shows set in Taiwan